The Green Party-Intwari (VERT-Intwari) is a small ecologist, predominantly ethnic Tutsi political party in Burundi.

Green parties in Africa
Political parties in Burundi